Cleodoxus sergioi is a species of longhorn beetles of the subfamily Lamiinae. It was described by Monné in 1984, and is known from eastern Ecuador.

References

Beetles described in 1984
Acanthocinini